Poppy seed is an oilseed obtained from the opium poppy (Papaver somniferum). The tiny, kidney-shaped seeds have been harvested from dried seed pods by various civilizations for thousands of years. It is still widely used in many countries, especially in Central Europe and South Asia, where it is legally grown and sold in shops. The seeds are used whole or ground into meal as an ingredient in many foods – especially in pastry and bread – and they are pressed to yield poppyseed oil.

History

The poppy seed is mentioned in ancient medical text from many civilizations. For instance, the Egyptian papyrus scroll named Ebers Papyrus, written c. 1550 BC, lists poppy seed as a sedative. The Minoan civilization (approximately 2700 to 1450 BC), a Bronze Age civilization which arose on the island of Crete, cultivated poppies for their seed, and used a milk, opium and honey mixture to calm crying babies. The Sumerians are another civilization that are known to have grown poppy seeds.

Description

Poppy seeds are less than a millimeter in length, kidney-shaped, and have a pitted surface. It takes about 3,300 poppy seeds to make up a gram, and between 1 and 2 million seeds to make up a pound. The primary flavor compound is 2-pentylfuran.

The seeds of other poppy types are not eaten, but they are cultivated for the flowers they produce. Annual and biennial poppies are considered a good choice to cultivate from seed as they are not difficult to propagate by this method, and can be put directly in the ground during winter. The California poppy (Eschscholzia californica), for example, is a striking orange wildflower that grows in the Western and Northwestern United States.

Production

In 2018, world production of poppy seeds was 76,240 tonnes, led by Turkey with 35% of the world total, followed by the Czech Republic and Spain as other major producers (table).

The poppy seeds harvest can be a by-product of cultivation of Papaver somniferum for opium, poppy straw, or both opium and poppy straw. However, harvesting for poppy seeds of superior quality is in conflict with harvesting for opium as poppy seeds should be harvested when they are ripe, after the seed pod has dried. Traditionally, opium is harvested while the seed pods are green and the seeds have just begun to grow and their latex is abundant. Poppy straw can be a by-product of cultivation of poppy seeds. Compared to the seed pod and straw, the seeds contain very low levels of opiates. The seeds may be washed to obtain poppy tea but a large amount is needed, around 300–400 g depending on the levels of opiates.

Since poppy seeds are relatively expensive, they are sometimes mixed with the seeds of Amaranthus paniculatus, which closely resemble poppy seeds.

Nutrition 

In a 100 gram amount, poppy seeds provide 525 calories and are a rich source of thiamin, folate, and several essential minerals, including calcium, iron, magnesium, manganese, phosphorus and zinc (table). Poppy seeds are composed of 6% water, 28% carbohydrates, 42% fat, and 21% protein (table).

Food products

Intact seeds
Whole poppy seeds are widely used as a spice and decoration in and on top of many baked goods and pastries. In North America they are used in and on many food items such as poppyseed muffins, rusk, bagels (like the Montreal-style bagel), bialys, and cakes such as sponge cake. Poppy seeds can also be used like sesame seeds, added to hamburger buns or to make a bar of candy. The bars are made from boiled seeds mixed with sugar or with honey. This is especially common in the Balkans, Greece and even in the cuisines of former Austro-Hungarian countries.

The color of poppy seeds is important in some uses. According to The Joy of Cooking, "the most desirable come from Holland and are a slate-blue color." When used as a thickener in some dishes, white poppy seeds are preferred, having less impact on the color of the food. In other dishes, black poppy seeds are preferred, for maximum impact. Blue poppy seeds are used in various German breads and desserts as well as in Polish cuisine.

Paste

Poppy seeds can be ground using a generic tool such as a mortar and pestle or a small domestic type electric blade grinder, or a special purpose poppy seed grinder.  A poppy seed grinder (mill) is a type of burr grinder with a set aperture that is too narrow for intact poppy seeds to pass through.  A burr grinder produces a more uniform and less oily paste than these other tools.

The poppy seed paste is used for fillings in pastries, sometimes mixed with butter or milk and sugar. The ground filling is used in poppy seed rolls and some croissants and may be flavored with lemon or orange zest, rum and vanilla with raisins, heavy cream, cinnamon, and chopped blanched almonds or walnuts added. For sweet baked goods, sometimes instead of sugar a tablespoon of jam, or other sweet binding agent, like syrup is substituted. The poppy seed for fillings are best when they are finely and freshly ground because this will make a big difference in the pastry filling's texture and taste.

Poppy seed paste is available commercially, in cans.  Poppy seeds are very high in oil, so commercial pastes normally contain sugar, water, and an emulsifier such as soy lecithin to keep the paste from separating.  Commercial pastes also contain food preservatives to keep them from becoming rancid.

In the United States, commercial pastes are marketed under brand names including Solo and American Almond.  Per 30 gram serving, the American Almond poppy seed paste has 120 calories, 4.5 grams fat, and 2 grams protein.

Oil
Poppy seeds are pressed to form poppyseed oil, a valuable commercial oil that has multiple culinary and industrial uses.

Other uses
Poppy seeds are often used as bird seed, in which case they are usually called maw seeds.

Use by cuisine

Poppy seeds are used around the world in various cuisines.

European cuisine

Across Europe, buns and soft white bread pastries are often sprinkled on top with black and white poppy seeds (for example cozonac, kalach, kolache and kołacz).
The seeds of the Czech blue poppy (food safety cultivars Papaver somniferum) are widely consumed in many parts of Central and Eastern Europe. The sugared, milled mature seeds are eaten with pasta, or they are boiled with milk and used as filling or topping on various kinds of sweet pastry. Milling of mature seeds is carried out either industrially or at home, where it is generally done with a manual poppy seed mill.

Blue poppy seeds are widely used in Austrian, Croatian, Czech, Danish, German, Hungarian, Lithuanian, Polish, Romanian, Russian, Serbian, Slovak, Slovenian, Turkish and Ukrainian cuisines.

The states of former Yugoslavia (notably North Macedonia and Serbia, but also Croatia and Bosnia) have a long tradition of preparing poppy seed pastry (štrudla, baklava, pajgle) and dishes (pasta with poppy seeds). In Slovenia blue poppy seeds are used in traditional dishes such as prekmurska gibanica and makova potica. 

In Poland, Hungary, Lithuania and Eastern Slovakia, a traditional dessert is prepared for the Kūčios (Christmas Eve) (in Hungarian: mákos guba) dinner from poppy seeds. They are ground and mixed with water or milk; round yeast biscuits (kūčiukai in Lithuanian; opekance or bobalky in Slovak) are soaked in the resulting poppy seed 'milk' (poppy milk) and served cold.

In Central Europe, poppy strudel is very popular, especially during Christmas. In Germany, Poland and countries belonging to the former Austro-Hungarian Empire, poppy seed pastries called Mohnkuchen are often eaten around Christmas time. Recipes for Mohnstriezel use poppy seed soaked in water for two hours or boiled in milk. A recipe for Ukrainian poppyseed cake recommends preparing the seeds by immersing in boiling water, straining and soaking in milk overnight.

Jewish cuisine
In Eastern European Jewish cuisine, pastries filled with black poppy seeds in a sugary paste are traditional during Purim, which occurs exactly one month before Passover and approximately a month before Easter.  Traditional pastries include poppy seed kalács and hamantashen, both sometimes known as beigli (also spelled bejgli).  Poppy seed hamantashen were the main traditional food eaten by Ashkenazi Jews at Purim until the filling was replaced by other fruit and nut fillings.  Poppy seed pastries are common in Jewish bakeries and delicatessens throughout the United States.

Indian cuisine

In Indian cuisine, white poppy seeds are added for thickness, texture and flavor to recipes. Commonly used in the preparation of korma, ground poppy seeds, along with coconut and other spices, are combined into a paste added during cooking. Poppy seeds are widely used in many regional Indian cuisines. One dish is aloo posto (potato and poppy seeds) which consists of ground poppy seeds cooked together with potatoes and made into a smooth, rich product, which is sometimes eaten with rice. There are many variants to this basic dish, replacing or complementing the potatoes with other ingredients, such as onions (penyaj posto), pointed gourd (potol posto), Ridged Luffa (jhinge posto), chicken (murgi posto), and prawns (chingri posto). Chadachadi is a dish from Bengali cuisine and includes long strips of vegetables, sometimes with the stalks of leafy greens added, all lightly seasoned with spices like mustard or poppy seeds and flavored with a phoron. One dish involves grilling patties made from posto, sometimes frying them (postor bora). Another dish involves simply mixing uncooked ground poppy seeds (kancha posto) with mustard oil, chopped green chili peppers, fresh onions and rice. Kacha posto bata (uncooked poppy seeds paste) with mustard oil is a very popular dish in West Bengal as well as Bangladesh. Poppy seeds are widely used in Kashmir as a topping on various breads, especially kulcha.

Poppy seeds, along with tulsi (basil) seeds, are added to beverages such as thandai, sharbat, milkshakes, rose milk, almond milk and khus khus milk.

Health effects
Eating large quantities of poppy seeds can cause a phytobezoar which can block the bowels, although this is unlikely if the seeds are consumed in moderation as an ingredient in cooked or baked foods.

Allergy (type 1 hypersensitivity) to poppy seeds is rare, but has been reported and can cause anaphylaxis.

False positive drug tests 

Although the drug opium is produced by "milking" latex from the unripe fruits ("seed pods") rather than from the seeds, all parts of the plant can contain or carry the opium alkaloids, especially morphine and codeine. This means that eating foods (e.g., muffins) that contain poppy seeds can result in a false positive for opiates in a drug test. However the results provided will not be the same for someone who uses opiates.

Morphine levels in poppy seeds range between 4 and 200 mg/kg. According to an article published in the Medical Science Law Journal, after ingesting "a curry meal or two containing various amounts of washed seeds" where total morphine levels were in the range 58.4 to 62.2 µg/g seeds, the urinary morphine levels were found to range as high as 1.27 µg/ml (1,270 ng/ml) urine. Another article in the Journal of Forensic Sciences reports that concentration of morphine in some batches of seeds may be as high as 251 µg/g. In both studies codeine was also present in the seeds in smaller concentrations. Therefore, it is possible to cross the current standard 2,000 ng/ml limit of detection, depending on seed potency and quantity ingested. Some toxicology labs still continue to use a cutoff level of 300 ng/ml.

Discovery Channel's MythBusters series episode "Poppy Seed Drug Test" demonstrated that eating both poppy seed bread and poppy seed bagels resulted in both of the hosts testing positive for opiate use, 30 minutes later.

To minimize the problems caused by false positives for competitive athletes, the USADA recommends that competitive athletes refrain from eating foods containing poppy seeds several days prior to a competitive event.

A fictional example of such a false positive test in popular culture was in the Seinfeld episode "The Shower Head", where the character Elaine Benes was not allowed to visit Kalahari Bushmen with J. Peterman after testing positive for opium from the consumption of poppy seed muffins.

Legal status
The sale of poppy seeds from Papaver somniferum is banned in Singapore because of the morphine content. Poppy seeds are also prohibited in Taiwan, primarily because of the risk that viable seeds will be sold and used to grow opium poppies.

China prohibits spice mixes made from poppy seed and poppy seed pods because of the traces of opiates in them, and has since at least 2005.

Despite its present use in Arab cuisine as a bread spice, poppy seeds are also banned in Saudi Arabia for various religious and drug control reasons. In one extreme case in the United Arab Emirates, poppy seeds found on a traveler's clothes led to imprisonment. Concerns were raised in Malaysia by MP Datuk Mohd Said Yusof who claimed in 2005 that mamak restaurants used poppy seeds in their cooking to get customers addicted to it.

It is illegal to grow opium-bearing cultivars of Papaver genus in Russia, although  selling poppy seeds is not restricted in most regions.

International travelers 
As poppy seeds cause false positive results in drug tests, it is advised in airports in India not to carry such items to other countries, where this can result in punishments based on false positive results. Travelers to the United Arab Emirates are especially prone to difficulties and severe punishments.

In Singapore, poppy seeds are classified as "prohibited goods" by the Central Narcotics Bureau (CNB).

Gallery

See also
 List of poppy seed pastries and dishes

References

Further reading
Jenő Bernáth. Poppy: The Genus Papaver. CRC Press, 1998. .
 

Crops
Edible nuts and seeds
Poppy seeds
Spices
Indian spices
Poppies